Peperomia macrorhiza is a species of plant in the genus Peperomia. It is endemic to Peru.  It is a geophytic plant, storing water and reserves in an underground tuber. During dry periods parts above ground, such as leaves, will wither away but the plant will survive due to the tuber. When more rain falls the plant regrows its stalks and leaves on the surface.

References

macrorhiza
Flora of Peru
Drought-tolerant plants
Caudiciform plants
Geophytic peperomias